John Bertram (1837–1904) was a Canadian politician.

John Bertram may also refer to:
John Bertram (died 1450), MP for Northumberland
John Bertram (architect) (born 1966), American architect
John Bertram (Massachusetts businessman) (1795–1882), American sea captain, businessman and philanthropist

See also

John Bartram (1699–1777), American botanist, horticulturist and explorer